Nan Kyay Ngon (born 22 October 1987) is a Burmese footballer who plays as a midfielder. She has been a member of the Myanmar women's national team.

International career
Nan Kyay Ngon capped for Myanmar at senior level during the 2014 AFC Women's Asian Cup (and its qualification).

References

1987 births
Living people
Women's association football midfielders
Burmese women's footballers
People from Kayin State
Myanmar women's international footballers